On 3 August 1979, a Constitutional Convention election was held in Hamedan Province constituency with plurality-at-large voting format in order to decide two seats for the Assembly for the Final Review of the Constitution.

The constituency was a scene of rivalry between candidates of different Islamic groups and no communist or secular nationalist ran for a seat. The result was a landslide victory for the two candidates supported by both the Islamic Republican Party and the Combatant Clergy Association. Members of other parties such as the Muslim People's Republic Party, the Movement of Militant Muslims and JAMA (the latter endorsed by the Quintuple Coalition) were defeated.

Result

 
 
|-
|colspan="14" style="background:#E9E9E9;"|
|-
 
 
 
 
 

|colspan=14|
|-
|colspan=14|Source:

References

1979 elections in Iran
Hamadan Province